Justin Wilcock (born June 8, 1979) is an American diver. He competed at the 2004 Summer Olympics in Athens, in the men's 3 metre springboard. Wilcock was born in Smithfield, Utah.

References

1979 births
Living people
American male divers
Olympic divers of the United States
Divers at the 2004 Summer Olympics
People from Smithfield, Utah